Sepia stellifera is a species of cuttlefish native to the Indian Ocean. The mantle length of males is 140 mm, and 150mm in females. It lives at depths of 34 to 95 m.

References

Cuttlefish
Molluscs described in 1984